Alyaksandr Oreshnikow (born 25 May 1973) is a Belarusian former football defender.

Oreshnikow spent five seasons in the Russian Premier League from 1995 through 2000, four with FC Krylia Sovetov Samara and another with FC Lokomotiv Nizhny Novgorod, playing in over 100 league matches.  He also made two appearances for the Belarus national football team during 1996.

References

External links
 
 Statistics at Sportbox.ru

1973 births
Living people
Belarusian footballers
Belarusian expatriate footballers
Belarus international footballers
Association football defenders
PFC Krylia Sovetov Samara players
FC Elista players
FC Lokomotiv Nizhny Novgorod players
FC Sodovik Sterlitamak players
Expatriate footballers in Russia
Russian Premier League players
FC Fandok Bobruisk players
FC Belshina Bobruisk players
FC Slavia Mozyr players
FC Neftekhimik Nizhnekamsk players
FC Novokuznetsk players